Hakea recurva, commonly known as jarnockmert, is a flowering shrub or small tree in the family Proteaceae and is endemic to an area in the Mid West, northern Wheatbelt and the Goldfields-Esperance regions of Western Australia. It has creams-white to yellow flowers and thick, prickly, curved leaves.

Description
It is multi-stemmed with branchlets densely covered in fine, flattened, silky hairs and quickly becoming smooth. The fragrant inflorescence may have 20-40 large cream-yellow flowers in clusters in the leaf axils. The leaves may be straight or recurved ending with a sharp point.

Taxonomy and naming
Hakea recurva was first formally described in 1856 by Carl Meisner and the description was published in Prodromus Systematis Naturalis Regni Vegetabilis. The specific epithet (recurva) means "curved", referring to the leaves.

Distribution and habitat
Hakea recurva grows in open scrub or mulga on granitic loam, sand, sandy-clay, gravel and laterite. Occurs in area bounded by the Murchison River, Laverton and Israelite Bay.

There are two subspecies:

References

recurva
Eudicots of Western Australia